Taylor Flavell (born 5 July 1994) is a New Zealand born Australian female squash player. She has been competing on the PSA World Tour and achieved a highest singles career ranking of 91. Taylor placed third at the 2019 World Doubles Squash Championships with fellow player Selena Shaikh.

Currently Taylor is the Studio Manager of F45 Chinatown Melbourne - a fitness organisation that is the fastest growing gym franchise in the world. She was appointed as the club coach for the Melbourne Cricket Club squash section in 2018.

References 

1994 births
Living people
Australian female squash players
Sportspeople from Rotorua
21st-century Australian women